The 1974 Major League Baseball postseason was the playoff tournament of Major League Baseball for the 1974 season. The winners of each division advance to the postseason and face each other in a League Championship Series to determine the pennant winners that face each other in the World Series.

In the American League, the Baltimore Orioles returned for the fifth time in the past six seasons, and the Oakland Athletics were making their fourth straight postseason appearance. In the National League, the Pittsburgh Pirates made their fourth appearance in the past five seasons, and the Los Angeles Dodgers made their first postseason appearance of the division era, returning for the first time since the 1966 World Series. 

The playoffs began on October 5, 1974, and concluded on October 17, 1974, with the Oakland Athletics defeating their fellow California rival in the Los Angeles Dodgers in five games in the 1974 World Series. The Athletics pulled off a three-peat, becoming only the second franchise in the MLB to accomplish such a feat, the other being the New York Yankees.

Playoff seeds
The following teams qualified for the postseason:

American League
 Baltimore Orioles – AL East champions, AL best record, 91–71
 Oakland Athletics – AL West champions, 90–72

National League
 Pittsburgh Pirates – NL East champions, 88–74
 Los Angeles Dodgers – NL West champions, NL best record, MLB best record, 102–60

Playoff bracket

American League Championship Series

Baltimore Orioles vs. Oakland Athletics

In the third postseason meeting between these two teams, the Athletics once again defeated the Orioles, this time in four games, to advance to the World Series for the third year in a row.

The Orioles got the best of Oakland ace Catfish Hunter in Game 1, while the Athletics struck back in Game 2 off a complete game shutout performance from Ken Holtzman. Game 3 was a complete game pitcher's duel between Oakland's Vida Blue and Baltimore's Jim Palmer, which the Athletics won 1-0 to go up 2-1 in the series. Hunter rebounded for the Athletics in Game 4, as he and Rollie Fingers helped shut down the Orioles' offense to secure the pennant.

With the win, the Athletics moved up to 2-1 against the Orioles all-time in the postseason. The Orioles would not return to the postseason again until 1979. This was the last AL pennant won by the Athletics until 1988, where they swept the Boston Red Sox en route to the World Series, where they were upset by the Los Angeles Dodgers in five games.

National League Championship Series

Los Angeles Dodgers vs. Pittsburgh Pirates

This was the only postseason meeting between the Dodgers and Pirates. The Dodgers defeated the Pirates in four games to return to the World Series for the first time since 1966.

The Dodgers stole Game 1 in Pittsburgh as Don Sutton pitched a complete game shutout, and then took Game 2 after fending off a rally by the Pirates. When the series shifted to Los Angeles for Game 3, the Pirates, thanks to stellar pitching performances from starter Bruce Kison and relief pitcher Ramón Hernández, blew out the Dodgers in a 7-0 shutout to avoid a sweep. However, the Dodgers would respond in Game 4 by thrashing the Pirates by an eleven run margin of victory to clinch the pennant. The Dodgers' 12-1 blowout win in Game 4 was the largest margin of victory in an LCS game, which would be matched by the New York Yankees in Game 3 of the 2004 ALCS before they fell in seven games to the Boston Red Sox.

This was the first of three NL pennants won by the Dodgers during the 1970s, as they would win it again in 1977 and 1978, defeating the Philadelphia Phillies both times. The Pirates would return to the NLCS the next year, but were swept by the Cincinnati Reds. They would win their next pennant in 1979.

1974 World Series

Oakland Athletics (AL) vs. Los Angeles Dodgers (NL) 

This was the first all-California World Series, the first World Series since 1956 to feature two teams representing the same state, as well as the first World Series matchup between teams from the Greater Los Angeles area and the San Francisco Bay Area. The Athletics upset the 102-win Dodgers in 5 games to successfully three-peat as World Series champions, becoming the second franchise in MLB history to accomplish such a feat after the New York Yankees.

Despite ending in five games, each game of the series was decided by three runs or less. Rollie Fingers helped fend off a late rally by the Dodgers as the Athletics stole Game 1 on the road. In Game 2, Dodgers' closer Mike Marshall fended off a late rally by the Athletics in the bottom of the ninth inning to even the series headed to Oakland. In Game 3, the Athletics held off another late rally by the Dodgers to win by one run. In Game 4, the Athletics overcame a one-run Dodgers' lead in the bottom of the sixth with four unanswered runs to win and go up 3-1 in the series. In Game 5, Fingers gained his second save of the series as the Athletics prevailed by one run to clinch the title.

The Athletics returned to the postseason the next year in hopes to add a fourth consecutive title, but were swept by the Boston Red Sox in the ALCS. The Dodgers would return to the World Series in 1977 and 1978, but lost both to their old American League rival in the New York Yankees in six games.

Both teams would meet again in the 1988 World Series, where the Dodgers returned the favor and upset the heavily favored Athletics in five games in a mirror-image of this World Series.

References

External links
 League Baseball Standings & Expanded Standings - 1974

 
Major League Baseball postseason